Kuthenkuzhi (Kūttaṉkuḻi) is a village in Tamil Nadu, India. It is in the Radhapuram taluk of Tirunelveli district. It gets its name from the Tamil word for Nataraja, ( Kūttaṉ).

After the time of Francis Xavier in 1542, many of the inhabitants converted to Christianity. This village belongs to Tuticorin Diocese. The occupation of majority of people living in this village is fishing.

Kuthenkuzhi has a Catholic church named for Quiteria and one dedicated to The Three Magi. People of the village celebrate Christmas in December, The Three Kings Festival during January, Saint Quiteria's festival in May and also John the Baptist's festival.

Notable people
 Ignaci Siluvai, priest and educator

Religion
The residents of this village belong to the Roman Catholicism. 
 Church of Epiphany  
 St. Quiteria(Kitheri ammal) Church
 St. Michael Church
 Holy Cross Church

See also
 Pastor Lenssen Polytechnic College

Villages in Tirunelveli district